Calvin Keys (born February 6, 1943) is an American jazz guitarist, known for the several albums he released for Black Jazz Records.

Keys has performed and recorded with Ray Charles, Ahmad Jamal, John Handy, Bobby Hutcherson, Eddie Marshall, Sonny Stitt, Pharoah Sanders, Joe Henderson and Leon Williams.

Discography

As leader
 Shawn-Neeq (Black Jazz, 1971)
 Proceed with Caution! (Black Jazz, 1974)
 Criss Cross (Ovation, 1976)
 Full Court Press (Olive Branch, 1985)
 Maria's First (Olive Branch, 1987)
 Standard Keys [live] (Lifeforce Jazz, 1992 [1997])
 Detours into Unconscious Rhythms (Wide Hive, 2000)
 Touch (Olive Branch, 2000) compilation
 An Evening With Calvin Keys [live] (Lifeforce Jazz, 2003) 2-CD
 Calvinesque (Silverado, 2005)
 Vertical Clearance (Wide Hive, 2006)
 Hand Made Portrait (Silverado, 2007)
 Electric Keys (Wide Hive, 2013)
 Close Enough For Love (Lifeforce Jazz, 2015)
 Simply Calvin (Lifeforce Jazz, 2022)
 Blue Keys (Wide Hive, 2022)

As sideman
With Ahmad Jamal
 Recorded Live at Oil Can Harry's (Catalyst, 1976)
 Steppin Out with a Dream (20th Century Fox, 1976)
 One (20th Century Fox, 1978)
 Night Song (Motown, 1980)
 Live in Paris 1996 (Birdology/Dreyfus, 1999)

With others
 Gene Russell, Talk to My Lady (Black Jazz, 1973)
 Billy Brooks, Windows of the Mind (Crossover, 1974)
 Doug Carn, Adam's Apple (Black Jazz, 1974)
 Doug Carn, Higher Ground (Ovation, 1976)
 Gene Russell, Listen Here (Ovation, 1976)
 James Newton Howard, Dying Young (Arista, 1991)
 Dissent, Dissent (Wide Hive, 1999)
 Azeem, Mayhem Mystics (Wide Hive, 2004)

References

External links
Official site
Calvin Keys discography at Jazzlists
Calvin Keys Page at Wide Hive Records
"Electric Keys" Page at Wide Hive Records
"Vertical Clearance" Page at Wide Hive Records
"Detours Into Unconscious Rythms(sic)" Page at Wide Hive Records

Living people
1943 births
American jazz guitarists
Black Jazz Records artists
African-American guitarists
Musicians from the San Francisco Bay Area
American male guitarists
20th-century American guitarists
Jazz musicians from California
Guitarists from California
20th-century American male musicians
American male jazz musicians
20th-century African-American musicians
21st-century African-American people